Amancio may refer to:

Places
Amancio, Cuba, a town in Las Tunas province

People
Amancio Alcorta (1842–1902), Argentine legal theorist
Amancio Jacinto Alcorta (1805–1862), Argentine composer
Amancio Amaro (1939–2023), Spanish footballer
Amancio D'Silva (1936–1996), Indian-born jazz guitarist and composer
Amancio Guedes (1925–2015), Portuguese architect, sculptor, and painter
Amancio Ortega (born 1936), Spanish fashion executive and founding chairman of the Inditex
Amancio Williams (1913–1989), Argentine architect
Ebert William Amâncio (born 1983), Brazilian footballer better known as Betão
Amancio Paraschiv (born 1992), Romanian professional welterweight kickboxer and amateur boxer

See also

Portuguese masculine given names
Spanish masculine given names